Elisapee Sheutiapik is a Canadian politician, who served as mayor of Iqaluit, Nunavut, from 2003 to 2010, and was elected to the Legislative Assembly of Nunavut in the 2017 general election.

Mayoralty
She won the mayoral election in 2003, defeating the incumbent mayor John Matthews by 40 votes, and was acclaimed to a second term in 2006.

On 10 September 2008, CBC North reported that Sheutiapik would be taking a leave of absence to run in the Nunavut election. She ran in Iqaluit West, which had the highest voter turnout at 90.2 per cent, but was defeated by incumbent MLA Paul Okalik by 44 votes. She subsequently returned to the mayor's chair.

On 19 October 2009, Sheutiapik won a third term as mayor of Iqaluit. Her opponent was former city councillor Jim Little, who took 42.3% of the vote as opposed to 57.7% for Sheutiapik. On November 9, 2010, she announced her resignation as mayor effective December 13. She was succeeded by Madeleine Redfern.

In the 2017 Nunavut territorial election, Sheutiapik again faced off against Okalik in the riding of Iqaluit-Sinaa. This time, she won with 44.8% of the vote, defeating him with 237 votes to 150, as well as two other candidates.

Activism
Sheutiapik, whose sister Mary Ann was murdered by an abusive relative in 1997, has collaborated with Iqaluit-based rock singer Lucie Idlout on a national project to have cities across Canada name a city street "Angel" as a memorial to Canadian victims of domestic violence. As of 2014, cities that have named Angel Streets as part of the campaign included St. John's, Edmonton, Regina, Fredericton, Yellowknife and Kamloops.

Electoral record

References

Mayors of Iqaluit
Inuit politicians
Women mayors of places in Nunavut
Canadian Inuit women
Living people
Year of birth missing (living people)
Women MLAs in Nunavut
21st-century Canadian politicians
21st-century Canadian women politicians
Members of the Legislative Assembly of Nunavut
Inuit from the Northwest Territories
Inuit from Nunavut
Women government ministers of Canada
Members of the Executive Council of Nunavut
Inuit activists